Elachyophtalma flavolivacea is a moth in the family Bombycidae. It was described by Walter Rothschild in 1920. It is found on New Guinea.

References

Bombycidae
Moths described in 1920